Hugh III de Montfort, Lord of Montfort-sur-Risle, was an Anglo-Norman noble.

Hugh was the son of Gilbert de Gant and Alice, Dame de Montfort-sur-Risle. He adopted the name and arms of his mother to inherit the lordship of Montfort-sur-Risle. He joined the baron revolt in Normandy against King Henry I of England in 1122 and was known to be in an English prison in 1123.

Marriage and issue
Hugh married Adeline, daughter of Robert de Beaumont, Earl of Leicester and Count of Meulan, and Elisabeth de Vermandois, they are known to have had the following issue:
Robert II de Montfort, Lord of Montfort-sur-Risle, married Anne de Fougères; had issue
a daughter who married Guillaume de Saint-Clair; had issue
a daughter who married Richard FitzRobert, Sire de Creully; had issue
Waleran de Montfort
Toustain (or Thurstan) de Montfort, Lord of Beaudésert; had issue.

References
   Nobiliaire universel de France Volume 2 (French)

Year of birth unknown
Year of death unknown
11th-century French people
12th-century French people
Medieval French knights